Mareth museum is a military museum, in Mareth. Located between Gabes and Medenine, the Mareth line museum deals with the Second World War history. In March 1943, Rommel used this bunkered line to resist Montgomery's VIIIth army advance. The battle of the Mareth Line ensued. The Museum is built on a hill overlooking the Wadi Zigzaou, near several casemates (military pillboxes) which were strongpoints of the defensive line. Command posts, anti-tank and anti-aircraft guns are displayed outside the museum.

References

Museums in Tunisia
Gabès Governorate
Military and war museums